Katherine Ann Lund (born November 27, 1996) is an American professional soccer player who plays as a goalkeeper for Racing Louisville FC of the National Women's Soccer League (NWSL).

Club career 
Racing Louisville FC selected Lund from Washington Spirit in the 2020 NWSL Expansion Draft. Lund led Racing Louisville FC to the inaugural Women's Cup win in August 2021.

Lund had a breakout season in 2022, setting the NWSL record for saves in a single season and being named to the NWSL Best XI for September/October. She started every regular-season game for Racing, posting six clean sheets.

References

External links 
 
 Racing Louisville FC profile
 Arkansas profile
 TCU profile

1996 births
Living people
American women's soccer players
Washington Spirit players
Racing Louisville FC players
Women's association football goalkeepers
National Women's Soccer League players
TCU Horned Frogs women's soccer players
Arkansas Razorbacks women's soccer players